Pirates in Batavia (2020) (German Piraten in Batavia) is a water dark ride at Europa-Park that opened on July 28, 2020. It was rebuilt in place of the old ride by the same name, which burned down in a fire in 2018. The ride was built by Mack Rides in 1987 and was situated in a large hall at the Dutch themed area, which was designed as a typical Dutch clinker brick building from the outside.

Although located in the Dutch area, its theming is largely based on Indonesia (then the Dutch East Indies), in which the Dutch colonized.

Theming 

The ride is set during a pirate raid on Jakarta (known as Batavia until 1942) in the 17th century at the beginning of the Dutch colonization of Indonesia.

Ride 

The building of the ride was characterized with a banner labeled with "Piraten in Batavia" in golden letters and a Jolly Roger. The station was situated on the first floor. On their way to the station, visitors were introduced to the backstory, while learning about the history of the Dutch colonisation of Indonesia, shown in different animated scenes. Mural paintings showed the Java Sea, including the maps of Sumatra, Borneo and Java.

At the station the visitors got on one of the boats, each with a capacity of 16 riders. The first scene showed a cave in the Indonesian jungle, which was inhabited by different animals and humans. After a wide bend, the boat went down a waterfall and passed through a battle scene, in which a pirate ship attacked a nearby fort. The scene was dominated by screaming pirates and gunfire. Through a break in the fortification wall, the boat arrived in Batavia, which was full of marauding pirates. In the following scenes the visitor experienced how the pirates won over the native women, staving off their hunger by eating exotic animals and getting drunk. The ride carried on passing a hidden temple in the jungle, a burning fort, a fishermen's village and a jail.

Just before the end of the ride, the boats passed a show venue on the right, which was embedded into the setting, and the themed restaurant Bamboe Baai.

Fire 

On 26 May 2018, Pirates in Batavia burned to the ground in a fire that destroyed the main themed area of the Scandinavia portion of the park. The cause of the fire is unknown, but a fireball erupted in a storage hall and spread towards the ride building resulting in high flames and a smoke plume stretching for miles. At first, the area was evacuated, but this was later revised to include the whole park. The park re-opened on Sunday, albeit with the Scandinavia and Norwegian sections of the ride closed. Two attractions, the 'Fjord-Rafting' and the 'Dschungel-Floßfahrt' remained closed, as firefighters had used water from those attractions to battle the fire.

References

External links

 Official page of Europa-Park attraction (English)
 Pirates in Batavia on freizeitpark-welt.de (German)
 Pirates in Batavia on flickr.com

Amusement rides introduced in 1987
Amusement rides that closed in 2018
Amusement rides manufactured by Mack Rides
Rides at Europa-Park